Tricia Griffith (born October 1964) is an American business executive who currently serves as the president and chief executive officer of The Progressive Corporation.

Early life and education
Griffith attended Illinois State University for her undergraduate degree, and then took part in the advanced management program at University of Pennsylvania, Wharton School of Business.

Career
Tricia Griffith was appointed president and chief executive officer and elected to the Board of Directors of The Progressive Corporation in July 2016. She was the first female to hold this position in the history of the company.

Prior to being named CEO, Griffith served as Progressive's Personal Lines Chief Operating Officer since April, 2015, overseeing Progressive's Personal Lines, Claims, and Customer Relationship Management groups.

Griffith joined Progressive as a Claims Representative in 1988 and has served in many key leadership positions during her tenure. She held several managerial positions in the Claims division before being named Chief Human Resources Officer in 2002. As Chief Human Resources Officer, Griffith launched Progressive's first-ever diversity and inclusion program, establishing the Progressive African American Network and LGBT Plus in 2007. In 2008, she returned to Claims as the group president, overseeing all claims functions. Prior to being named Personal Lines Chief Operating Officer, Griffith was President of Customer Operations, overseeing claims and the customer management group, which comprises the company's contact center group (sales and delivery), as well as the customer experience, systems experience, and workforce management groups.

Griffith has a bachelor's degree from Illinois State University and is a graduate of the Wharton School of Business’ Advanced Management Program.

Recognition
 Fortune placed Griffith in the 18th spot of its annual Most Powerful Women in Business in 2016.
 In November 2018, Griffith was the first woman to be named Fortune's Businessperson of the Year.
 Griffith was featured as Fortune's 13th Most Powerful Businesswoman in November 2018.

See also
List of women CEOs of Fortune 500 companies

References

American women chief executives
American chief executives of Fortune 500 companies
21st-century American businesspeople
Living people
1965 births
21st-century American businesswomen